Jamie Winter (born 4 August 1985 in Dundee) is a Scottish football player.

Career

He started his career with Leeds United, but failed to make an impact. He moved to Aberdeen at the end of 2005. He failed to make an impact, but scored a free kick against Celtic in a 3–1 defeat. He spent the second half of the 2005–06 season on loan to St Johnstone.

Winter was told that he would be leaving Aberdeen at the end of the 2006–07 season. He signed for Chesterfield on 20 July 2007, until the end of June 2009. At the end of the 2008–09 season, Chesterfield chose not to renew Winter's contract and he became a free agent. Winter then signed for Highland League club Formartine United, but his contract was terminated by mutual consent during the 2009–10 season.

On 7 August 2010, Winter signed for Dundee based junior club Broughty Athletic. Winter then signed for Montrose in 2011. On 22 August 2013, Winter returned to junior club Broughty Athletic. On 25 October 2018, Winter signed A New Contract with junior club Carnoustie Panmure.

References

External links
 (pre-Montrose)
 (Montrose)

Living people
1985 births
Scottish footballers
Association football midfielders
Leeds United F.C. players
Aberdeen F.C. players
St Johnstone F.C. players
Chesterfield F.C. players
Formartine United F.C. players
Broughty Athletic F.C. players
Montrose F.C. players
English Football League players
Scottish Premier League players
Scottish Football League players
Footballers from Dundee